"L'amore si odia" (Italian for "Love is to be hated") is a duet by Italian singers Noemi and Fiorella Mannoia. The song is the second single for Noemi and the first single for Fiorella Mannoia, who put it her album Ho imparato a sognare.

The song
"L'amore si odia" was written by Diego Calvetti and Marco Ciappelli and produced by Diego Calvetti. On 24 May 2010, Noemi and Mannoia got one Wind Music Award for sales of this song, which also obtained a double platinum disc.

Track listing
Digital download

Music video
The music video for "L'amore si odia" was produced by Gaetano Morbioli.

Charts

Year-end charts

Cover versions
In 2009, Marco Mengoni, the winner of the 3rd season of the Italian version of X Factor performed the song during the second live show. The song was later included in his debut EP, Dove si vola.

References

2009 singles
Noemi (singer) songs
Fiorella Mannoia songs
Number-one singles in Italy
Italian-language songs
Songs written by Diego Calvetti
Songs written by Marco Ciappelli
2009 songs
Sony Music singles